This article show a list of caves in Greece'''.

Deepest caves in Greece 

The deepest caves in Greece in order of depth are:

 Gourgouthakas in the Lefka Ori mountains, Crete. Explored depth −1,208m (1997) ending in a sump with some unexplored leads.
 Cave of the Lion, Trou de Leon (in French) in the Lefka Ori mountains, Crete. Explored depth −1,110m (2008) ending in a sump but exploration of leads is ongoing.
 Tafkoura in Mount Psiloritis / Mount Ida, Crete. Explored depth −860m (1996) ending in a sump and with many unexplored leads.

Other caves in Greece 

The Acropolis cave complex in Athens, Prefecture of Attica includes:
an Asclepieion on the northwest slope
the Cave of Auglaros
The Mycenean Cavern, an abandoned Mycenean well on the northwest slope
 Agalaki Cave, southwest of Sami, near Poulata in Kefalonia Isl, Prefecture of Kefalonia
 Aghios Ioannis-Kastro, Skopelos Isl, Prefecture of Magnesia
 Agios Georgios Cave – in the city of Kilkis, Prefecture of Kilkis
 Alepotrypa or Alepotripa – near Pramanda, Prefecture of Ioannina
 Alistrati's Caves
 Angitis – Maara, Prefecture of Drama
 Apidima Cave – western shore of Mani Peninsula
 Archantropon of the Red Stone Cave – near Petralona, Prefecture of Chalkidiki
 Asprochaliko Cave – in the city of Philippiada, Prefecture of Preveza
 Bekiris, Spetses Isl. Prefecture of Piraeus
 Blue Cave – in the island of Kastelorizo, Prefecture of Dodecanese
 Cave of Aghios Ioannis, Heraklia Isl, Prefecture of Cyclades
 Cave of Ellenokamara – near Aghia Marina, Kasos Isl, Prefecture of Dodecanese
 Cave of Harkadio, Messaria Castle, Telos Isl, Prefecture of Dodecanese
 Cave of the Lakes or cave of the Nymphs – near Kalavryta, Prefecture of Achaia
 Cave of Oliaros, Antiparos Isl, Prefecture of Cyclades
 Cave of Parasta, Kastelorizo Isl, Prefecture of Dodecanese
 Cave of the Seven Virgins, Kalymnos Isl, Prefecture of Dodecanese
 Cave of Trypas Kefalas – near Kefala, Kalymnos Isl, Prefecture of Dodecanese
 Corycian Cave
 Dirou Cave complex (water cave) – near Areopoli, Prefecture of Laconia, includes:
River cave of Glyfada
Alepotrypa Cave
 Drogarati Cave – near Chaliotata, Kefalonia Isl, Prefecture of Kefalonia
 Franchthi Cave, Prefecture of Argolis
 Kastania Cave near Neapolis, Monemvasia Municipality, Prefecture of Laconia
 Kastritsa Cave – near Katsikas, Prefecture of Ioannina
 Katafyghi – near Aghios Nikolaos (Selenitsa), Prefecture of Messinia
 Kleidi Cave – near Konitsa in the Ioannina prefecture
 Korykio or Korykion Andron, Mount Parnitha, Prefecture of Attica
 Megalakkos Cave – near Konitsa, Prefecture of Ioannina
 Melissani Cave in Kefalonia Isl, Prefecture of Kefalonia
 Perama Cave – near Perama, Prefecture of Ioannina
 Cave of Trypia Petra or Blue cave, Lalaria beach, Skiathos Isl, Prefecture of Magnesia
 Trypitis – near Glysteri, Skopelos Isl, Prefecture of Magnesia
 Vari Cave, Mount Hymettus, Athens, Prefecture of Attica
 Vrachoskepi or Asprochaliko Cave – near Filippiada, Prefecture of Preveza
 Blue cave, Kastelorizo Isl, Prefecture of Dodecanese
 Cave of Panagia Spiliani – near Mandraki, Nisyros Isl, Prefecture of Dodecanese
 Cave of Vathis, Kalymnos Isl, Prefecture of Dodecanese
 Cave of Aghios Antonios, Prefecture of Rethymno, Crete
 Cave of Aghios Ioannis Erimitis, Akrotiri Peninsula, Prefecture of Chania, Crete
 Cave of Aghios Mamas, Elafonisi Isl, Prefecture of Chania, Crete
 Cave of Aghia Sophia – near Topolia, Prefecture of Chania, Crete
 Cave of Aghia Paraskevi – near Gouves, Prefecture of Heraklion, Crete
 Cave of Genari, Prefecture of Rethymno, Crete
 Cave of Gouverneto or Arkoudas, Akrotiri Peninsula, Prefecture of Chania, Crete
 Cave of Eylithias – near Amnissos, Prefecture of Heraklion, Crete
 Cave of Kamares, Prefecture of Heraklion, Crete
 Cave od Idi or Idieon Andron, Mount Idi, Prefecture of Heraklion, Crete
 Cave of Dikti or Diktieon Andron, Mount Dikti or Lasithi, Prefecture of Lasithi, Crete
 Cave of Melidoni, Prefecture of Rethymno, Crete
 Cave of Milatos, Prefecture of Lasithi, Crete
 Cave of Pelekita or Sykias, Pelekita beach – near Kato Zakros, Prefecture of Lasithi, Crete
 Cave of Sfendoni – near Zoniana, Prefecture of Rethymno, Crete
 Didima caves – near Didima, Prefecture of Argolis
 Mount Olympus Caves, Tempi Valley, Prefecture of Larissa
 Ochyron cave or the cave of the Cyclops – near Maronia, Prefecture of Rodopi
 Blue Lake cave, Zakynthos Isl
 Mount Ohi cave or cave of Aghia Triada – near Karystos, Evia Isl, Prefecture of Evia
 Halandriani cave, Syros Isl, Prefecture of Cyclades
 Fanokopeio cave or cave of Aghia Sophia, Kythira Isl, South Peloponnese, Prefecture of Piraeus
 Cave of Proussos or Black cave, Mount Panetolikon, Prefecture of Evritania
 Panormos cave, Mykonos Isl, Prefecture of Cyclades
 Cave of the Apocalipse – Aghios Ioannis, Patmos Isl, Prefecture of Dodecanese
 Cave of Zoures & Cave of Harakas – near Azogyres, Prefecture of Chania, Crete
 Cave of Kournas, Kournas lake, Prefecture of Chania, Crete
 Cave of Centaurus, Mount Pelion, Prefecture of Magnesia
 Water cave of Loumbarda, Platania, Prefecture of Magnesia
 The Huge water caves of Horefto, Amaliapolis, Prefecture of Magnesia
 Heiron cave – near Vizitsa, Mount Pelion, Prefecture of Magnesia
 Tsanaka cave, Kanalia, Prefecture of Karditsa
 Cave of Mavromati or Georgios Karaiskakis, Mavromati, Prefecture of Karditsa
 Cave of Boursi or Kefalovryso – near Elasson, Prefecture of Larissa
 Cave of the Cyclops Polyphemos – near Makri, Prefecture of Evros
 The Two caves, Didimoteiho, Prefecture of Evros
 Cave of Aghia Paraskevi – near Deskati, Prefecture of Grevena
 Cave of Zakas, Mount Orliakas, Prefecture of Grevena
 Cave of Dispili – near Dispili, Prefecture of Kastoria
 The Dark cave – near Akrini, Prefecture of Kozani
 Prionia cave, Mount Vermio, Prefecture of Imathia
 Saranda Outades cave, city of Naoussa, Prefecture of Imathia
 Neolithic cave of Rodohorion, Prefecture of Imathia
 Drakotrypa cave – near Panagia, Thasos Isl, Prefecture of Kavala
 Efta Myloi cave – near Serres, Prefecture of Serres
 Lyhnos bay cave complex & the cave of Afrodite – near Parga, Prefecture of Preveza
 Cave complex of Lynaria, Skyros Isl, Prefecture of Evia
 Cave of Ntavelli – near Aghia Triada, Mount Penteli, Prefecture of Attica
 Cave of Euripides – near Peristeria, Salamina Isl, Prefecture of Piraeus
 Cave of Cyclops – near Astakos, Prefecture of Aetolia & Acarnania
 Cave of Syllas, Thermes of Edipsos, Prefecture of Evia
 Pasogourni cave – near Lihada, Prefecture of Evia
 Cave of Loizos – near Stavros, Ithaka Isl, Prefecture of Kefalonia
 Cave of Nymphs – near Vathy, Ithaka Isl, Prefecture of Kefalonia
 Water cave of Ypapanti – near Lakka, Paxi Isl, Prefecture of Corfu
 Cave of the Demon – near Spartohorion, Lefkada Isl, Prefecture of Lefkada
 Cave of Papanikolis, Lefkada Isl, Prefecture of Lefkada
 Cave of Spileovouno – near Fiskardo, Kefalonia Isl, Prefecture of Kefalonia
 Cave of Drakospilia – near Lixouri, Kefalonia Isl, Prefecture of Kefalonia
 Cave of Agios Gerasimos – near Argostolion, Kefalonia Isl, Prefecture of Kefalonia
 Cave of Zervatis – near Sami, Karavomylos, Kefalonia Isl, Prefecture of Kefalonia
 Sakkos cave – near Skala, Temple of Apollo, Kefalonia Isl, Prefecture of Kefalonia
 Pelaou cave – near Aghios Mattheos, Corfu Isl, Prefecture of Corfu
 Dionysus cave or cave of Sintzas – near Leonidio, Prefecture of Arkadia
 The Lovers' cave, Tigani beach – near Tyros, Prefecture of Arkadia
 Cave of Neraidotrypa – near Portes, Kato Achaia, Prefecture of Achaia
 The Watercave – near Aghia Marina, Prefecture of Chania, Crete
 Sarakena cave – near Therissos, Prefecture of Chania, Crete
 Daskalojianni cave – near Fragkocastello, Prefecture of Chania, Crete
 Hoirospelios cave – near Fournes, Prefecture of Chania, Crete
 Ahladolakki cave & Grai cave – near Malaxa, Prefecture of Chania, Crete
 The Minoan holy cave – near Arkalohorion, Prefecture of Heraklion, Crete
 Hosto Nero cave – near Arhanes, Prefecture of Heraklion, Crete
 Honos cave – near Asites, Prefecture of Heraklion, Crete
 Cave of Vigla – near Viannos, Prefecture of Heraklion, Crete
 Matala caves or cave complex of Kommos, Prefecture of Heraklion, Crete
 Trapeza cave, Mount Dikti or Lasithi, Prefecture of Lasithi, Crete
 Cave of Panagia Poulariani – near Analipsi, Astypalea Isl, Prefecture of Dodecanese
 Dragon cave – near Vathi, Astypalea Isl, Prefecture of Dodecanese
 Negrou cave – near Lebadia, Astypalea Isl, Prefecture of Dodecanese
 Emporeios caves, Kalymnos Isl, Prefecture of Dodecanese
 Poseidon cave – near Myloi, Karpathos Isl, Prefecture of Dodecanese
 Aspri Petra cave – near Palatia, Kos Isl, Prefecture of Dodecanese
 Holy cave of the Nymphs – near the city of Rhodes, Rhodes Isl, Prefecture of Dodecanese
 Kalamonias cave – near Faliraki, Rhodes Isl, Prefecture of Dodecanese
 Makarouna cave – near Kalamos, Rhodes Isl, Prefecture of Dodecanese
 Koumelou cave – near Arhaggelos, Rhodes Isl, Prefecture of Dodecanese
 Kelia caves, Chalki Isl, Prefecture of Dodecanese
 Kammenos cave – near Amiglai, Chalki Isl, Prefecture of Dodecanese
 Chaos cave – near Mesaria, Andros Isl, Prefecture of Cyclades
 Vromolimni cave, Kimolos Isl, Prefecture of Cyclades
 Ktafyki cave – near Dryopida, Kythnos Isl, Prefecture of Cyclades
 Cave of Za – near Filotas, Naxos Isl, Prefecture of Cyclades
 Cave of Koutala or Cyclop, Seriphos Isl, Prefecture of Cyclades
 Gastria cave – near Kionia, Tinos Isl, Prefecture of Cyclades
 Two Caves – near Panormos, Tinos Isl, Prefecture of Cyclades
 Papafragka cave – near Apollonia, Archeological site, Milos Isl, Prefecture of Cyclades
 Cave of Toihos – near Hivadolimni, Donoussa Isl, Prefecture of Cyclades
 Blu Caves, Kato Koufonisi Isl, Prefecture of Cyclades
 Black cave – near Kastro, Sikinos Isl, Prefecture of Cyclades
 Golden Cave, Folegandros Isl, Prefecture of Cyclades
 Cave of Georghitsi – near Karavostasis, Folegandros Isl, Prefecture of Cyclades
 Cave of Aghios Vartholomeos – near Mytilene, Lesvos Isl, Prefecture of Lesvos & Lemnos
 Black Stone cave – near Plomari, Lesvos Isl, Prefecture of Lesvos & Lemnos
 Cave of Aghios Isidoros – near Plomari, Lesvos Isl, Prefecture of Lesvos & Lemnos
 Kokkala cave – near Plomari, Lesvos Isl, Prefecture of Lesvos & Lemnos
 Cave of Pythagora – near Marathokampos, Samos Isl, Prefecture of Samos & Ikaria
 Church cave of Sarandaskaliotissa – near Marathokampos, Samos Isl, Prefecture of Samos & Ikaria
 Cave of Trypiovrahos – near Pyrgos, Samos Isl, Prefecture of Samos & Ikaria
 Cave of Philoctetes – near Kontopouli, Lemnos Isl, Prefecture of Lesvos & Lemnos
 Dersios Sinkhole – near Tyros, Prefecture of Arcadia

See also 
 List of caves
 Speleology

External links 
showcaves.com, a detailed list of show caves in Greece
Greek National Tourism Organisation, tourist information on caves
Hellenic Federation of Speleology, Greece's Caving Federation
Hellenic Speleological Society – Greece's oldest caving organisation (founded 1950)with an extensive and priceless archive of over 10,000 explored and recorded caves.

 
Greece
Caves